How Do You Like Me Now?! is the fifth studio album by American country music artist Toby Keith. It was released on November 2, 1999 by DreamWorks Records and was his first album with the label after Keith departed from Mercury Records in 1998. The album produced four singles, "When Love Fades", the title track, "Country Comes to Town", and "You Shouldn't Kiss Me Like This."

The album was produced by James Stroud, who was the head of DreamWorks Records.

Track listing

Musicians
Mike Brignardello - bass guitar
Larry Byrom - acoustic guitar
Mark Casstevens - acoustic guitar
Dan Dugmore - steel guitar
Paul Franklin - steel guitar
Sonny Garrish - steel guitar
Owen Hale - drums
Aubrey Haynie - mandolin
Clayton Ivey - piano, keyboards, organ
Toby Keith - lead vocals
Paul Leim - drum programming on "New Orleans"
B. James Lowry - acoustic guitar
Terry McMillan - harmonica
Jerry McPherson - electric guitar
Brent Mason - electric guitar
Steve Nathan - keyboards, organ
Brent Rowan - electric guitar
John Wesley Ryles - background vocals
Gary Smith - piano, keyboards, organ
Glenn Worf - bass guitar
Curtis Young - background vocals

Chart performance

Weekly charts

Year-end charts

References

1999 albums
Toby Keith albums
DreamWorks Records albums
Albums produced by James Stroud
Albums produced by Toby Keith